Ryszard Kraus (30 June 1964 – 3 November 2013) was a Polish professional football striker who played for the Poland national football team.

Club career
Kraus played 5 years for Ekstraklasa side Górnik Zabrze, scoring 16 goals for them in the 1990/91 season.

International career
Kraus made his debut for Poland in a February 1991 friendly match against Northern Ireland and has earned a total of 4 caps, scoring no goals.

His final international was a July 1992 friendly match against Guatemala.

Death
Kraus died on 3 November 2013.

References

External links
 

1964 births
2013 deaths
People from Bielsko County
Association football forwards
Polish footballers
Poland international footballers
GKS Jastrzębie players
Odra Wodzisław Śląski players
Górnik Zabrze players
GKS Tychy players
Sportspeople from Silesian Voivodeship